Bradley Mathias Kaaya Jr. (born September 3, 1995) is a former American football quarterback. He played college football at the University of Miami from 2014 to 2016, and was drafted by the Detroit Lions in sixth round of the 2017 NFL Draft. Kaaya is the all time passing yards leader at Miami.

Early years
Kaaya attended Chaminade College Preparatory School in West Hills, Los Angeles, California, where he played high school football for the Eagles. As a senior, he threw for a school-record 3,855 yards and 27 touchdowns. During his high school career, he threw for 5,730 yards and 40 touchdowns while leading his school to their first ever CIF and CA State Championship (2013). He was ranked by the Rivals.com recruiting network as the eighth best pro-style quarterback recruit in his class and was also a member of Nike’s Elite 11, showcasing the top 11 QB recruits in the nation.

College career
Kaaya was named the Hurricanes starting quarterback as a true freshman over Jake Heaps by head coach Al Golden on August 24, 2014. Kaaya led the Hurricanes to a 6–7 overall record and a bowl appearance, losing to South Carolina in the 2014 Independence Bowl. In his second year starting, the 2015 Hurricanes improved to 8–5, with a loss to Washington State in the Sun Bowl. Kaaya had the 2016 Hurricanes off to their best start of his career, going 4–1 and reaching as high as #10 in the AP Poll. Miami finished the 2016 season with a 9–4 record and a win over West Virginia in the 2016 Russell Athletic Bowl. Kaaya was named bowl MVP and became Miami’s all time QB leader in nearly every passing statistic including yards.

On January 2, 2017, Kaaya announced that he would be entering the 2017 NFL Draft rather than returning to Miami for his final season of eligibility.

College statistics

Kaaya was named ACC Rookie of the year following a 2014 regular season in which he led the league in pass efficiency and touchdown passes.

Professional career

Detroit Lions
The Detroit Lions selected Kaaya in the sixth round (215th overall) of the 2017 NFL Draft. He was the ninth quarterback selected in the 2017 NFL Draft. On May 12, 2017, the Lions signed Kaaya to a four-year, $2.52 million contract with a signing bonus of $123,352. He was waived by the Lions on September 2, 2017.

Carolina Panthers
On September 3, 2017, Kaaya was claimed off waivers by the Carolina Panthers. He was waived by the Panthers on October 17, 2017.

Detroit Lions (second stint)
On October 18, 2017, Kaaya was claimed off waivers by the Lions. On October 23, 2017, Kaaya was waived by the Lions and re-signed to the practice squad.

Indianapolis Colts
On December 27, 2017, Kaaya was signed by the Indianapolis Colts off the Lions' practice squad.

On August 24, 2018, Kaaya was waived/injured by the Colts and placed on injured reserve. He was waived from injured reserve on February 8, 2019.

Cincinnati Bengals
On February 11, 2019, Kaaya was claimed off waivers by the Cincinnati Bengals. However, the Bengals declined to assign him a restricted free agent tender for 2019, making Kaaya an unrestricted free agent at the start of the new league year in March.

Personal life
Kaaya's mother, Angela Means, is a vegan cook and former actress, who is best known for her role as Felisha in the 1995 classic film Friday as well as Veda in House Party 3 and Aunt Vanessa in the TV series Cousin Skeeter. His father Brad Kaaya Sr. coached him in Pop Warner football and is a former screenwriter who wrote for the film O and the TV series Cousin Skeeter, Damon, and MADtv. His surname originates from Tanzania.

References

External links

Miami Hurricanes bio

1995 births
Living people
American people of Tanzanian descent
People from West Hills, Los Angeles
Players of American football from Los Angeles
American football quarterbacks
Miami Hurricanes football players
Detroit Lions players
Carolina Panthers players
Indianapolis Colts players
Cincinnati Bengals players
Chaminade College Preparatory School (California) alumni